Sir Thomas North (28 May 1535c. 1604) was an English translator, military officer, lawyer, and justice of the peace. His translation into English of Plutarch's Parallel Lives is notable for being the main source text used by William Shakespeare for his Roman plays.

Life
Thomas North was born between 9 and 10 o'clock at night on Friday, 28 May 1535, in the parish of St Alban, Wood Street, in the City of London. He was the second son of the Edward North, 1st Baron North.

He is supposed to have been a student of Peterhouse, Cambridge, and was entered at Lincoln's Inn in 1557. In 1574 he accompanied his brother, Lord North, on a diplomatic mission to the French court in Lyon. He served as captain of a band of footmen in Ireland in 1580, was appointed to defend the Isle of Ely in the year of the Armada, and was knighted about three years later. He returned again to Ireland in 1596.

His name is on the roll of justices of the peace for Cambridge in 1592 and again in 1597. He was presented with a reward of £25 for his part in putting down Essex's Rebellion in 1601, and received a small pension (£40 a year) from Queen Elizabeth that same year.

Translations

Guevara
He translated, in 1557, Guevara's Reloj de Principes (commonly known as Libro áureo), a compendium of moral counsels chiefly compiled from the Meditations of Marcus Aurelius, under the title of Diall of Princes. The English of this work is one of the earliest specimens of the ornate, copious and pointed style for which educated young Englishmen had acquired a taste in their Continental travels and studies.

North translated from a French copy of Guevara, but seems to have been well acquainted with the Spanish version. The book had already been translated by Lord Berners, but without reproducing the rhetorical artifices of the original. North's version, with its mannerisms and its constant use of antithesis, set the fashion which was to culminate in John Lyly's Euphues.

Eastern fables 
His next work was The Morall Philosophie of Doni (1570), a translation of an Italian language version of originally Indian fables, popularly known as The Fables of Bidpai which had come to Europe primarily through Arabic translations.

Plutarch's Lives
North published his translation of Plutarch in 1580, basing it on the French version by Jacques Amyot. The first edition was dedicated to Queen Elizabeth, and was followed by another edition in 1595, containing fresh Lives. A third edition of his Plutarch was published, in 1603, with more translated Parallel Lives, and a supplement of other translated biographies.

According to the Encyclopædia Britannica Eleventh Edition, "[i]t is almost impossible to overestimate the influence of North's vigorous English on contemporary writers, and some critics have called him the first master of English prose".

Shakespeare
The Lives translation formed the source from which Shakespeare drew the materials for his Julius Caesar, Coriolanus, Timon of Athens, and Antony and Cleopatra. It is in the last-named play that he follows the Lives most closely, whole speeches being taken directly from North.

Tudor Translations
North's Plutarch was reprinted for the Tudor Translations (1895), with an introduction by George Wyndham.

Notes

References

Further reading

External links
The Perseus Project contains some of Thomas North's translations
North's Plutarch, pdf document scanned from the 1910, Dent edition of North.
First edition of North's Plutarch at the British Library (photographs of title page and selected pages).

1535 births
1604 deaths
Italian–English translators
Greek–English translators
16th-century translators
Alumni of Peterhouse, Cambridge
16th-century English people
Younger sons of barons
Thomas